Terbol, is a village located in the Zahlé District of the Beqaa Governorate in Lebanon.
The International Center for Agricultural Research in the Dry Areas (ICARDA) is located in the village.

History
In 1838, Eli Smith noted  Terbul  as a Maronite and Catholic village in the Baalbek area.

References

Bibliography

External links
Terbol, localiban

Populated places in Zahlé District